The Spartan DFS Trike is an American ultralight aircraft designed and produced by Spartan Microlights. The aircraft was the first ultralight introduced that could be flown with a hang glider-style wing as an ultralight trike or with a powered parachute wing.

The designation of DFS stands for Dual Face System, referring to its ability to mount either hang glider or powered parachute wings.

Design and development
It features a cable-braced hang glider-style high-wing, weight-shift controls, a single-seat open cockpit, tricycle landing gear and a single engine in pusher configuration. In powered parachute mode it uses a Shuttle GRX canopy and is controlled with aerodynamic brakes.

The aircraft fuselage is made from aluminum tubing, while the hang glider wing is made from bolted-together aluminum tubing and covered in Dacron sailcloth. The hang glider wing is supported by a single tube-type kingpost and uses an "A" frame control bar. A fiberglass cockpit fairing, windshield, brakes and floats are optional. Present engines available include the  Zanzottera MZ 34,  Hirth F-33 and the  Rotax 447.

In 2012 the aircraft was marketed under the name DFS Single.

Specifications (DFS with hang glider wing)

References

External links

1990s United States ultralight aircraft
Single-engined pusher aircraft
Powered parachutes
Ultralight trikes
Spartan Microlights aircraft